Labroides is a genus of wrasses native to the Indian and Pacific Oceans.  This genus is collectively known as cleaner wrasses, and its species are cleaner fish.

Species
The currently recognized species in this genus are:
 Labroides bicolor Fowler & B. A. Bean, 1928 (bicolor cleaner wrasse)

 Labroides dimidiatus (Valenciennes, 1839) (bluestreak cleaner wrasse)
 Labroides pectoralis J. E. Randall & V. G. Springer, 1975 (blackspot cleaner wrasse)
 Labroides phthirophagus J. E. Randall, 1958 (Hawaiian cleaner wrasse)
 Labroides rubrolabiatus J. E. Randall, 1958 (redlip cleaner wrasse)

References

 
Labridae
Marine fish genera
Taxa named by Pieter Bleeker